Hannes de Boer (2 December 1899 – 2 April 1982) was a Dutch long jumper. He took part in the Olympic Games of 1924 and 1928. He finished in sixth place in 1928, jumping a distance of 6.32m.

De Boer won six Dutch national titles in the long jump and set six Dutch records. The longest jump, 7.37m reached in 1928, would only be broken in 1951.

De Boer was also a member of the Dutch 4 x 100 metres relay team that set a national record in 1926. This record was broken in 1934 by a relay team that included Chris Berger and Tinus Osendarp.

De Boer was born in Hollum, on the West Frisian island of Ameland. He worked as an office clerk, but later became a cameraman for Dutch cinema newsreels. He died in Rijswijk, near The Hague, in 1982.

Honours
Dutch national long jump title: 6
 1925, 1926, 1927, 1928, 1929, 1930

Dutch national records

Notes

1899 births
1982 deaths
Dutch male long jumpers
Olympic athletes of the Netherlands
Athletes (track and field) at the 1924 Summer Olympics
Athletes (track and field) at the 1928 Summer Olympics
Sportspeople from Ameland
20th-century Dutch people